Freeman, West Virginia may refer to:
Freeman, Mercer County, West Virginia, a neighborhood of Bramwell, West Virginia
Freeman, Upshur County, West Virginia, an unincorporated community in Upshur County, West Virginia